Secret Child is a 2018 British biographical drama short film directed by Yewweng Ho and is his directing debut. The screenplay, written by Sam Hoare, is based on the memoirs from the book Secret Child by Gordon Lewis. The film stars Fiona Glascott, Austin Taylor and Aaron McCusker, and tells the story of a single mother and her eight-year-old son meeting her man from her past after nine years.

Secret Child had its world premiere at the Hollyshorts Film Festival in 2018 and was nominated for Best Period Piece, and its London premiere at New Renaissance Film Festival, in which it won Best Debut Film. The film has received over 20 international awards and nominations with generally positive reviews, who praised the performances of Glascott, Taylor and McCusker, Ho's direction and Darius Shu's cinematography of the film.

Plot 
At the age of eight, Gordon (played by Austin Taylor) is introduced to a much older man called Bill (played by Aaron McCusker) by his mother, Cathleen (played by Fiona Glascott).

Cast 

 Fiona Glascott as Cathleen
 Austin Taylor as Gordon
 Aaron McCusker as Bill

Production 
In 2017, producer Gordon Lewis and director Yewweng Ho teamed up with cinematographer Darius Shu to begin principal photography of the film. Fiona Glascott (Brooklyn, Fantastic Beasts: The Crimes of Grindelwald), Aaron McCusker (Bohemian Rhapsody, Shameless) and Austin Taylor (My Cousin Rachel, Doctor Who) were cast in the main roles for the film.

Lewis is in talks to develop Secret Child into a full-length feature or a television series with his second book Secret to Sultan coming soon.

Release 
Secret Child had its world premiere at the Hollyshorts Film Festival at the Chinese Theatre in Los Angeles on August 13, 2018. The film had its London premiere at Closeup Arthouse Cinema at the New Renaissance Film Festival on August 24, 2018.

Reception

Critical response 
Anna Mayers from Close Up Culture praised the film as '...beautiful" and that it was '...brought to life in a sweet yet truthful way'.

Awards and nominations

References

External links 

 Official website
 Secret Child on IMDb

British drama films
2010s English-language films